Symon Todde was an Oxford college head in the 16th-century.

He was a Fellow of Exeter College, Oxford, from 1502 to 1512; and Rector of Exeter College, Oxford, from 1512 – 1514.

References

Fellows of Exeter College, Oxford
Rectors of Exeter College, Oxford
16th-century English people